No Holds Barred is a 1989 American action film produced by Michael Rachmil, directed by Thomas J. Wright, written by Dennis Hackin and starring professional wrestler Hulk Hogan (who is billed as executive producer alongside Vince McMahon). It is owned by WWE under a "Shane Distribution Company" copyright and was released by New Line Cinema on June 2, 1989. Released seven years after his appearance in Rocky III, it was Hogan’s first starring role.

Plot
Rip Thomas is the World Wrestling Federation Heavyweight Champion, and his appearances on network television have been a thorn in the side of Mr. Brell, the head of the struggling World Television Network. Rip is a huge ratings draw while WTN is the lowest rated television network. The day after Rip's most recent title match against Jake Bullet, Brell attempts to entice Rip into joining his network, but he refuses. Angry at being stood up by a man he considers a “jock ass”, Brell tries to exact revenge by hiring his goons to jump Rip in the limo, but Rip successfully fights them off.

Later, Brell visits the No Count Bar, where he comes up with his own wrestling program called Battle of the Tough Guys. The show is successful due to the introduction of Zeus, an ex-convict and former protege of Rip's trainer, Charlie. Zeus wins the $100,000 tournament and becomes Brell's prized fighter.

Samantha Moore, a corporate spy, is sent by Brell to seduce Rip. However, Rip's good nature and dedication to charity win her over, and she confesses her identity to the wrestler and turns to his side. Brell learns of Samantha's defection and, vowing revenge, sends his underlings to kidnap and rape her. Rip stops the would-be rapist, throwing one of the stooges into a tree trunk.

Later, Rip is at a charity event when Brell and Zeus arrive, demanding that Rip prove his honor by fighting Zeus on Battle of the Tough Guys. Rip declines, wanting to set a good example for the children around him. Meanwhile, Rip's younger brother Randy and his friend, Craig, decide to check out Zeus for themselves, attending an illegal fight being held in a warehouse. After watching Zeus defeat the monstrous Rebar Lawless, Craig identifies Randy as Rip's brother to Brell and his associates. Randy attempts to defend himself but Zeus brutally beats him, sending him to the hospital. Enraged, Rip accepts Zeus' challenge to avenge his brother.

On the night of the match, Brell has Samantha kidnapped and orders Rip to go ten minutes with Zeus before losing the fight to save her life. As the battle begins, Samantha escapes, but just as Brell's goons corner her, Charlie and Craig rescue her and defeat the bad guys. Back in the arena, Zeus has the upper hand at the start of the fight, ruthlessly pummeling Rip, even attempting to impale him through the chest with one of the steel ring posts. Randy urges his brother to fight back. Rip is re-energized by Randy's words and once he sees Samantha is safe, gains a second wind and starts to turn the tides on Zeus. The fight destroys the ring, with Rip and Zeus continuing the battle up the through the stands as Brell watches from the control room.

Rip finally puts an end to the match by knocking Zeus off a catwalk and through the ring far below. A frustrated Brell begins destroying electrical equipment, enraged over Zeus' loss. Rip angrily goes after Brell intending to repay him for his misdeeds. Brell retreats, but accidentally touches live wires he had exposed in his tantrum and is electrocuted. With their enemies vanquished, Rip and Randy celebrate with their friends.

Cast
 Hulk Hogan as Rip Thomas
 Joan Severance as Samantha Moore
 Kurt Fuller as Tom Brell
 Tiny Lister as Zeus
 Mark Pellegrino as Randy Thomas
 Bill Henderson as Charlie
 Charles Levin as Ordway
 David Paymer as Unger
 Patrick O'Bryan as Craig
 Jeep Swenson as "Lugwrench" Perkins
 Bill Eadie as Jake Bullet
 Stan Hansen as Neanderthal
 Rebecca Wackler as Ms. Tidings
 Bruce Taylor as Mr. Johnson
 Gene Okerlund as himself
 Jesse Ventura as himself
 Howard Finkel as himself
 Joey Marella as himself
 Rick Allen as Unnamed Wrestler
 Marcus Bagwell (Uncredited)

Release

Home media
The film was released on VHS, Betamax, and LaserDisc in October 1989. It was released on DVD with a digitally remastered transfer by WWE Home Video under the WWE Studios banner on July 3, 2012. A Blu-ray Disc release followed in April 2014.

Reception

Box office
The movie debuted at #2, behind Indiana Jones and the Last Crusade, with $4,957,052 in ticket sales. Hogan writes in his autobiography the budget was about eight million dollars. Vince McMahon, who financed the movie, more or less broke even because of distribution fees. The final tally was $16,093,651 in ticket sales.

During the October 13, 1997 episode of Monday Night Raw, Vince McMahon joked, "Hogan promised me that if the movie lost money he was gonna return his salary. I guess the check is still in the mail." This was during the Monday Night Wars and was part of a number of digs at Hogan's then-new movie project Assault on Devil's Island. Raw commentator Jim Ross also joked during the late 90s; "No Holds Barred? More like No Profit Allowed."

Critical response
The film was panned by critics, with a 10% approval rating on Rotten Tomatoes based on 21 reviews.

Film critic Brian Orndorf described the film as "tremendously crude, unapologetically manipulative, and aimed directly at easily entertained 13-year-old boys."

Michael Wilmington of the Los Angeles Times gave the film a positive review and wrote: "The movie never takes itself seriously and director Tom Wright (TV's 'Beauty and the Beast') has fun with the wrestling montages. Hogan himself has an appealing screen presence—like a gallant teddy bear who goes berserk every 10 minutes or so."

The Philadelphia Inquirer'''s Desmond Ryan remarked: 

The Chicago Tribunes Gene Siskel remarked, simply, that No Holds Barred "is utterly lacking in the campy quality of the World Wrestling Federation telecasts."

In his 1991 review of Suburban Commando, Roger Ebert recalled that "despite the fact that [Hulk Hogan's] public image is often aimed at children [...] his first film, 'No Holds Barred' (1989) was surprisingly violent, sexist and blood-soaked."

Richard Harrington of The Washington Post said that "[Hogan's] performance is as dreadful as one might expect from a man with such limited skills outside the ring, made worse by a story that is at once more obvious and less inspired than your average Wrestlemania script. [...] 'No Holds Barred' makes 'Rocky' look like 'Citizen Pain.'"

Wrote Stephen Holden of The New York Times: 

Reviewing the Blu-ray in 2014, Felix Vasquez Jr. of Cinema Crazed wrote: "Hogan as The Ripper is a force of nature here, and he makes "No Holds Barred" in to a fun action cartoon."

Other media
No Holds Barred: The Match/The MovieNo Holds Barred: The Match/The Movie', as the event was billed, was shown on pay-per-view on December 27, 1989. The program consisted of the film in its entirety, followed by a match previously recorded at a Wrestling Challenge taping on December 12 in Nashville, Tennessee. It is currently one of the few WWE pay-per-views not yet available on the WWE Network.

 Background 
The main event pitted Hogan and Lister — appearing in character as "Zeus" — on opposing tag teams. Hogan teamed with longtime friend Brutus Beefcake, while the heel Zeus teamed with Randy Savage. The four had been involved in an intertwined feud since the summer. Zeus had made several appearances at WWF events and cut promos stating that he, and not Hogan, should have received top billing in No Holds Barred. Meanwhile, as Hogan and Savage were feuding over the WWF World Heavyweight Championship, Beefcake began feuding with Savage after Beefcake insulted Savage's manager Sensational Sherri during a TV taping. At the 1989 SummerSlam, Hogan and Beefcake teamed to defeat Savage and Zeus, after which the tag team feud simmered for several months as Zeus began appearing with Ted DiBiase in the lead-up to the 1989 Survivor Series. Unlike 1989 SummerSlam, Miss Elizabeth did not make an appearance at this event.

The Hogan-Beefcake vs. Savage-Zeus tag team rivalry resumed after the Survivor Series, in the lead-up to "No Holds Barred: The Match/The Movie."

Results

The Hogan-Beefcake vs. Savage-Zeus steel-cage match was part of a WWF Wrestling Challenge'' taping. In addition to matches pitting mid- and lower-card wrestlers against jobbers, other contests (which were not televised) saw "The American Dream" Dusty Rhodes defeat Big Boss Man, WWF Intercontinental Champion The Ultimate Warrior defeat Dino Bravo, The Colossal Connection (André the Giant and Haku) defeat WWF Tag Team Champions Demolition by countout, and Curt Hennig defeat Ron Garvin.

Hulk Hogan and Brutus Beefcake defeated Randy Savage and Zeus in the 09:27-long steel-cage match. The match could be won either by pinfall/submission or by having both members of a team escape the cage.

After a back-and-forth match early on, all four competitors were knocked out after Hogan hit a suplex on Zeus, and Beefcake and Savage hit each other's heads into the cage structure. Sensational Sherri (the manager of the Savage-Zeus team) handed a chain to Savage, who attempted to strike Beefcake with a fist drop off the top of the cage, but Beefcake recovered and caught Savage coming off. Eventually, Beefcake knocked Savage to the mat and escaped the cage; Savage—with some eventual help from Beefcake—crawled outside, tying the match at 1-apiece.

Meanwhile, Hogan rallied against Zeus, battering him before dropping three leg drops to score the pin and the win for the Hogan-Beefcake team.

Aftermath
This was Zeus' last match in the WWF, as Lister left shortly afterward; meanwhile, Savage continued to target Hogan, and later, The Ultimate Warrior, over the WWF Championship. Zeus (as Z-Gangsta) and Hogan would eventually face each other again in the main event at WCW's Uncensored (1996) with Savage this time partnering Hogan, in a two-versus-eight Doomsday Cage match.

Among the dark matches, the Demolition-Colossal Connection match was contested one day prior to the match where the Colossal Connection won the WWF Tag Team Championship, while Dino Bravo continued to be the Ultimate Warrior's top foe for the Intercontinental Championship.

Notes

External links
 
 
 Cinema Connoisseur review
 Review of No Holds Barred with animated screenshots at I-Mockery

1989 action films
1989 films
1989 in professional wrestling
American action films
Films shot in Atlanta
Films shot in Kansas
New Line Cinema films
Professional wrestling films
1980s English-language films
1980s American films